Simon Ayeko (born 10 May 1987) is a Ugandan distance runner who specialises in the 3000 metres steeplechase. He was the gold medallist in that event at the 2011 Military World Games. He has twice represented Uganda at both the World Championships in Athletics (2009, 2011) and the IAAF World Cross Country Championships (2006, 2008)

Ayeko made his breakthrough at the 2007 Summer Universiade where he was a minor medallist in both the 5000 metres and the 10,000 metres. He also made the final of the steeplechase at that event. He was a student at the Kampala International University. He had also been a double medallist at the African University Games in 2006, winning the 1500 m and taking a silver over 5000 m.

Personal bests
Outdoor track
800 metres – 1:49.00 min (2010)
1500 metres – 3:39.60 min (2009)
3000 metres – 8:01.91 min (2009)
5000 metres – 13:40.5h min (2006)
10,000 metres – 30:22.58 min (2007)
2000 metres – 5:27.63 min (2010)
3000 metres steeplechase – 8:18.04 min (2009)
Indoor track
3000 metres indoor – 8:03.34 min (2010)
2000 metres steeplechase indoors – 5:26.13 min (2010)
Road
10K run – 28:56 min  (2008)
Half marathon – 65:49 min (2008)

All information from All-Athletics profile.

International competitions

References

External links

Living people
1987 births
Ugandan male steeplechase runners
Ugandan male middle-distance runners
Ugandan male long-distance runners
World Athletics Championships athletes for Uganda
Universiade medalists in athletics (track and field)
Universiade medalists for Uganda
Medalists at the 2007 Summer Universiade
20th-century Ugandan people
21st-century Ugandan people